Alec Denton (born 30 July 1994) is an English footballer who plays as a forward.

Career
Denton was born in Sheffield. He joined Rotherham United in 2006, having previously played for Worksop Town Juniors. In April 2010, Denton signed a two-year scholarship with the club after progressing through the Centre of Excellence. In March 2012, Denton joined Northern Premier League side Stocksbridge Park Steels on loan after impressing in a friendly against the club. On 5 May 2012, Denton made his professional debut for the Millers in a 1–1 draw with Northampton Town, coming on as a substitute for Sam Hoskins. He was then offered a one-year development professional contract.

His first appearance in the 2012-13 season was when he came on as a substitute in a game where Rotherham lost 3–0 to Southend United.

On 11 January, Denton and fellow Miller youngster Mitch Rose joined Stamford on a one-month loan deal.

On 2 May 2013, Denton was released by Rotherham.

References

External links

1994 births
Living people
English footballers
Footballers from Sheffield
Association football forwards
Rotherham United F.C. players
Stocksbridge Park Steels F.C. players
Clipstone F.C. players
Sheffield F.C. players
English Football League players